Charlie Brown's was the common name for the Railway Tavern pub in Limehouse, London.

The pub was built  on the corner of Garford Street and the West India Dock Road and greatly extended in 1919.
The pub was demolished in November 1989 during construction of the Limehouse Link tunnel.

Source of the name 

Charlie Brown was the landlord of the pub from 1893 until his death in June 1932.

The exotic location in Chinatown, the character of the landlord and his large collection of curiosities from around the world made Charlie Brown's a tourist attraction.

"Following his death, the 'uncrowned king of Limehouse' lay in state in his pub and his funeral procession was one of the biggest the East End had ever seen with 16,000 people gathered at Bow Cemetery."

The pub was formally renamed as Charlie Brown's in 1972.

Second Charlie Brown's 

On his death, Charlie Brown's daughter Ethel took over the pub.

His son (also Charlie Brown) took over the Blue Posts, directly opposite, but in 1938 moved to South Woodford to a pub which he named Charlie Brown’s.

This pub was where Chigwell Road met the 20th-century built Southend Road, to which a link was added to the North Circular Road a few years later. In 1972 the pub was demolished when the roundabout was enlarged to allow aspects of the North Circular to have flyovers onto the newly built M11 motorway. This roundabout is commonly referred to as Charlie Brown's Roundabout.

References

External links 
http://www.british-history.ac.uk/report.aspx?compid=46477#s4
https://web.archive.org/web/20131029192101/http://www.britannia.com/travel/london/cockney/cbrown.html
http://eastlondonhistory.com/2010/11/07/charlie-browns-pub/

Charlie Brown's
Limehouse
Former pubs in London
Demolished buildings and structures in London
Buildings and structures demolished in 1989